Viana is an city and one of the nine municipalities that make up the province of Luanda in Angola. Viana lies 15 to 30 kilometers east as a suburb of the capital Luanda and has a population of 2,092,439 (2022), including about 6,000 long-term refugees primarily from Katanga Province in the Democratic Republic of the Congo.

The city was founded on 13 December 1963. Because of its proximity to the Luanda, Viana has experienced in recent years a very large increase in population and industry.

Administrative divisions
The municipality of Viana is made up of three communes:
 Zango
 Calumbo
 Viana

Transportation
Near Viana the new airport of Luanda, the Angola International Airport, will be built by the Chinese company China International Fund. Because of financial problems the project is on hold.

Viana is served by a station on the northern line of Angolan Railways (CFL).

It is to become a dry port.

See also 
 Railway stations in Angola
 Transport in Angola

References

Municipalities in Luanda
Populated places in Luanda Province
Dry ports
1963 establishments in Angola